Burchfield Nines is a jazz vocal album by Michael Franks, released in 1978 by Warner Bros. Records.

Track listing

Reception

Gene DellaSala of Audioholics.com praised the vinyl record to CD transfer, stating, "the sound quality of this CD is amazing, especially for its time frame."

Personnel

Musicians
 Michael Franks – vocals
Oscar Brashear – trumpet
Bud Shank – saxophone
Ernie Watts – saxophone
Leon Pendarvis – keyboards
John Tropea – guitar
Will Lee – bass guitar
Steve Gadd – drums
Ralph MacDonald – percussion

Support
Art design – John Cabalka
Design – Brad Kanawyer
Mixing – Al Schmitt, Capitol Recording Studios
Orchestral arrangement, conducting – Eumir Deodato
Photography – Jean Paglioso
Production coordinator – Noel Newbolt
Recording –  Jeffery Kawalek, Al Schmitt

References

Bibliography

Michael Franks (musician) albums
1978 albums
Albums arranged by Eumir Deodato
Albums produced by Tommy LiPuma
Warner Records albums